James Marsh (born 30 April 1963) is a British film and documentary director best known for his work on Man on Wire, which won the 2008 Academy Award for Best Documentary Feature, and The Theory of Everything, the multi-award-winning biopic of physicist Stephen Hawking released in 2014.

Early life
Marsh was born in Truro, Cornwall and raised in Sennen, a Cornish village, and Woolwich, a district in southeast London. In Woolwich, he lived in a "miserable council flat" with his family.

Marsh won a scholarship to the University of Oxford. As an undergraduate, he studied at St Catherine's College, Oxford and graduated with a degree in English.

Career
Marsh began his early career in directing with several documentaries made for the BBC. His first TV documentary was the 90-minute Troubleman – The Last Years of Marvin Gaye, and was followed by the 26-minute 1990 documentary The Animator of Prague starring Jan Švankmajer and his works. Later came The Burger and the King: The Life and Cuisine of Elvis Presley, which was made in 1995 and released in 1996, and the Welsh musician John Cale, which was made in 1998 and released in 1999. His relationship continued with the BBC as a director and producer for three Arena series episodes, including the celebrated film Wisconsin Death Trip (1999).

In 2005 he directed the film The King which was screened in the Un Certain Regard section at the 2005 Cannes Film Festival.

In 2008 he made the documentary Man on Wire, about Philippe Petit's walk between the Twin Towers of the World Trade Center in New York. Marsh based Man on Wire, in part, on Philippe Petit’s memoir To Reach the Clouds. Man on Wire won the Academy Award for Best Documentary Feature at the 81st annual Oscars, the BAFTA Award for Best British film, the Independent Spirit Award, and many others.  The film, called "exhilarating", has had a hugely positive audience response and was among the Top Ten Films of 2008 on many critics' lists.

In 2009, he directed the "1980" episode of Red Riding, which aired on Channel 4 in the UK.

He also directed Project Nim in 2010, which is based on the book Nim Chimpsky: The Chimp Who Would Be Human by Elizabeth Hess. It is a documentary about the landmark study conducted by Herbert S. Terrace on the subject of animal language acquisition and the subject of the study is a chimpanzee named Nim Chimpsky. Marsh watched different films to gain inspiration before making Project Nim. He watched E.T., Frederick Wiseman's Primate, and the Bresson film Au hasard Balthazar. He gained the most information from Au hasard Balthazar which is a fictional account of a donkey as it passes through various human owners. The structure of Project Nim reflects a lot from this film as we see the drama of the human world through the eyes of the chimpanzee.

In 2012, he directed Shadow Dancer, a joint Irish/UK production about the Irish republican movement, which was filmed in Dublin and London. The film features Clive Owen, Andrea Riseborough, Gillian Anderson, Domhnall Gleeson and Aidan Gillen.

Marsh directed The Theory of Everything released in 2014, a biopic on Stephen Hawking starring Eddie Redmayne and Felicity Jones. Marsh received a nomination for the BAFTA for Best Director and the film was nominated for five Academy Awards including Best Picture.

Personal life
Marsh currently lives in Denmark (Copenhagen) With his 2 daughters and his wife

Filmography
Narrative films and television

Documentary films

Accolades

References

External links
 

Living people
1963 births
English film directors
People from Truro
Directors of Best Documentary Feature Academy Award winners
Directors Guild of America Award winners
English documentary filmmakers
Alumni of St Catherine's College, Oxford
English expatriates in Denmark
People from Woolwich